It's a Man's Man's Man's World is a compilation album by American musician James Brown. It consists of tracks from his period with the King label, as well as the tracks "The Scratch" (previously released in 1961), as well as "It's a Man's Man's Man's World", "Is It Yes or Is It No?", and Ain't That a Groove (Parts 1 and 2), all released on singles in 1966. In addition, this album also includes three previously released songs by Brown with his vocal group, the Famous Flames (Bobby Bennett, Bobby Byrd, and Lloyd Stallworth).The hit songs, "Bewildered" and  "I Don't Mind", and the song, "Come Over Here", which was the B-side to the Brown /Famous Flames hit, "Shout and Shimmy." 

The album was released in 1966 by King.

Track listing

References

1966 albums
James Brown albums
King Records (United States) albums